Star Wars: Rebellion is a Star Wars comic written by Rob Williams and published by Dark Horse Comics. The first issue was published on April 12, 2006. The story is set in the Star Wars galaxy nine months after the Battle of Yavin depicted in the original Star Wars film, and continues some plot threads begun in Star Wars: Empire.

Story arcs

My Brother, My Enemy 
Several long running plot-lines come together. Angered and confused after being injured by Luke Skywalker, Imperial Officer Janek Sunber decides to go to Darth Vader himself. He is welcome as he has much to tell about Skywalker's life on Tatooine.

Jorin Sol is on a Rebellion flagship, under intense questioning. Some believe that he is some sort of trap, sent by the Imperials to damage the Rebellion.

Though not many believe this, it is true. Jorin Sol 'goes off'. He nearly kills Deena Shan, but she escapes with her life. Sunber decides to make his move also. Sol ends up killing two officers, Princess Leia is badly injured and the Rebel's fleet becomes known to the Imperials. Sunber confronts Luke.

A battle ensues, with losses on both sides. Most of the Rebel fleet escapes, except for the flagship. Sunber and Sol are apparently lost in fiery debris but not before Sol recovers his mind enough to program in a seemingly random course for the flagship. It escapes the Imperials, one of many rebel ships now scattered.

Luke Skywalker manages to detect the launch of an escape pod, which indicates the possibility of Sol or Sunber surviving. Leia is shown spending time healing. The flagship is shown being repaired.

The Ahakista Gambit

Issues
 Rebellion #1: My Brother, My Enemy, Part 1
 Rebellion #2: My Brother, My Enemy, Part 2
 Rebellion #3: My Brother, My Enemy, Part 3
 Rebellion #4: My Brother, My Enemy, Part 4
 Rebellion #5: My Brother, My Enemy, Part 5
 Rebellion #6: The Ahakista Gambit, Part 1
 Rebellion #7: The Ahakista Gambit, Part 2 (June 20, 2007)
 Rebellion #8: The Ahakista Gambit, Part 3 (July 11, 2007)
 Rebellion #9: The Ahakista Gambit, Part 4 (August 8, 2007)
 Rebellion #10: The Ahakista Gambit, Part 5 (September 2007)

Dramatis personae
Ackbar
Beru Lars (Mentioned only)
Biggs Darklighter (Flashback)
CT-1707
Darth Vader
Deela (Mentioned only)
Deena Shan
Drybal
Janek Sunber
Jorin Sol
Kale Roshuir
Kendal Ozzel
Leia Organa
Luke Skywalker
Owen Lars (Flashback)
Palpatine (Flashback)
R2-D2
Raze
Tepar (Mentioned only)
Tungo Li
Wedge Antilles
Wyl Tarson
Zuud

References

Sources

External links
Dark Horse listing for part 1
Dark Horse listing for part 2
Dark Horse listing for part 3
Dark Horse listing for part 4
Dark Horse listing for part 5

2006 comics debuts
Rebellion: My Brother, My Enemy